Ovwigbo Uba (born 21 January 1962) is a Nigerian boxer. He competed in the men's super heavyweight event at the 1988 Summer Olympics. At the 1988 Summer Olympics, he lost to Andreas Schnieders of West Germany.

References

External links
 

1962 births
Living people
Nigerian male boxers
Olympic boxers of Nigeria
Boxers at the 1988 Summer Olympics
Place of birth missing (living people)
Super-heavyweight boxers